All the Way from Memphis was a radio programme that aired from December 2004 to June 2006.  There were 12 half-hour episodes and it was broadcast on BBC Radio 4.  It was compiled, written and presented by James Walton, with team captains Tracey MacLeod, and Andrew Collins. Readings are by Beth Chalmers.

It was a pop music based quiz, with a similar format to Walton's The Write Stuff.

Since 2007, it was being repeated a number of times on BBC Radio 7 (now BBC Radio 4 Extra).

The following is a list of episodes, guest panellists and the broadcast details:

Key

 – Game won by Tracey's team.

 – Game won by Andrew's team.

 – Game tied.

Series 1

Series 2

References 
 Lavalie, John. "All the Way from Memphis." EpGuides. 06 Jul 2006. 29 Jul 2005  <http://epguides.com/Allthewayfrommemphis/>.

External links
 
 All the Way from Memphis at bbc.co.uk/programmes

BBC Radio 4 programmes
British radio game shows
2000s British game shows
Radio game shows with incorrect disambiguation